The 83rd 2006 Lithuanian Athletics Championships were held in S. Darius and S. Girėnas Stadium, Kaunas on 21–22 July 2006.

Men

Women

References 
Results

External links 
 Lithuanian athletics (old)
 Lithuanian athletics (new)

Lithuanian Athletics Championships
Lithuanian Athletics Championships, 2006
Lithuanian Athletics Championships